Xuân Trường is a rural district of Nam Định province in the Red River Delta region of Vietnam. As of 2003 the district had a population of 179,765. The district covers an area of 113 km2. The district capital lies at Xuân Trường town.

Administration
Xuân Trường town is the capital of the district and controls 19 communes: 
Xuân Thượng
Xuân Ngọc
Xuân Kiên
Xuân Tiến
Xuân Ninh
Xuân Vinh
Xuân Trung
Xuân Phương
Thọ Nghiệp
Xuân Đài
Xuân Bắc
Xuân Thuỷ
Xuân Phú
Xuân Hồng
Xuân Tân
Xuân Phong
Xuân Thành
Xuân Hoà
Xuân Châu

History
The time of the Lê dynasty, Xuân Trường District belonged to Thien Truong court. During the Nguyễn dynasty Tran Son Nam belonged to the Xuân Trường court. In 1945 the district was changed to Xuân Trường and belonged to Nam Ha province in 1965. In 1967 the district merged with Giao Thủy into Xuân Thuỷ district. The district re-established its old name in March 1997.

Characteristics
Xuân Trường is a major rice growing province and Xuân Đài rice - rice is still cultivated on  every year. The district has many traditional villages that produce crafts, including:

 Xuân Tiến - village of mechanics 
 Xuân Hồng - village of mulberry planting, silkworm raising and pulling cocoons 
 Xuân Phương - embroidery village 
 Xuân Ninh - village of wine cooking
 Xuân Kiên - village of rice paper

Xuân Trường is also a land of culture and history which was home to notable revolutionaries, including:

 General Secretary Trường Chinh 
 Deputy President of Congress, Dang Quan Thuy 
 Nguyen Dang Kinh, hero of the Pham Gia Trieu armed forces

Catholicism is spreading throughout Xuân Trường, a process that includes the establishment of numerous churches.

Tourist areas
 Memorial house of former General Secretary Trường Chinh
 Keo Hành Thiện Pagoda
 Xuân Hồng cultural village/commune 
 Bùi Chu Bishop (Xuân Ngọc commune) 
 Phu Chew (Xuân Phương) church

Temple areas
 Kiên Lao temples (Xuân Kiên) 
 Tho (Xuân Phong) 
 Temple Spring Group (Xuan Hung) 
 Xuân (Xuân Thuỷ) Greek temple 
 Xuân Trung Pagoda (Xuân Trung) 
 Nghĩa Xá Pagoda (Xuân Ninh)
 Temple An Cu (Xuân Vinh)

Festivals
 Keo Hành Thiện Pagoda festival

Specialties
 Xuân Đài tam rice
 Xuân Tiến raw fish dishes
 Kiên Lao wine 
 Xuân Bắc meat roll

References

Districts of Nam Định province